Lady Hugwangjuwon of the Wang clan was the second wife of Hyejong of Goryeo. She was the youngest, among Lady Gwangjuwon and Lady Sogwangjuwon. Following their father's execution in 945 after trying to put Prince Gwangjuwon in the throne, some modern scholars who believed that the daughters of a traitor often stripped from their title, expelled from the palace and killed together with the whole clan speculated that these sisters were met the same fate.

In popular culture
Portrayed by Kang Kyung-hun in the 2002–2003 KBS TV series The Dawn of the Empire.

References

External links
Lady Hugwangjuwon on Encykorea .

Royal consorts of the Goryeo Dynasty
Year of birth unknown
Year of death unknown
People from Gwangju, Gyeonggi